The First Baptist Church in Owensboro, Kentucky, established in , is one of the oldest churches in the city. It has five pastoral staff members. It has programs for an age range of a few weeks old to 100 year olds. One activity includes the Family Pavilion during Owensboro's Barbeque Festival. It is affiliated with the Southern Baptist Convention.

External links
 Home page

Baptist churches in Kentucky
Churches in Owensboro, Kentucky
Southern Baptist Convention churches